Indian Creek is a stream in Louisa and Muscatine counties, Iowa, in the United States. It is a tributary of the Iowa River.

Indian Creek was named after the Native Americans who once inhabited the area.

See also
List of rivers of Iowa

References

Rivers of Louisa County, Iowa
Rivers of Muscatine County, Iowa
Rivers of Iowa